Leemore S. Dafny is an American economist currently the Bruce V. Rauner Professor of Business Administration at Harvard Business School and a member of the faculty at John F. Kennedy School of Government.  She graduated from Harvard College and received a PhD in Economics from Massachusetts Institute of Technology.

Between 2012 and 2013, Dafny was deputy director for healthcare and antitrust in the Bureau of Economics at the Federal Trade Commission.

References

External links

Year of birth missing (living people)
Living people
Harvard Business School faculty
Harvard Kennedy School faculty
American women economists
Harvard College alumni
MIT School of Humanities, Arts, and Social Sciences alumni
21st-century American women